Published by Dalhousie University and the University of Guelph since 2010, every December, Canada's Food Price Report provides a forecast of Canadian food prices and trends for the coming year in Canada. In July 2020, it was announced that the University of Saskatchewan and University of British Columbia were joining the group.

The first report was released on 2 December 2009. Both predictive modelling through machine learning and econometrics are used to support the annual forecast. The report was published by the University of Guelph only from 2011 to 2016.  In 2015, the project was recognized as one of the University of Guelph's most significant research accomplishments over the past 50 years.

2018
The report published in December 2017 projected an increase in food prices in 2018 between 1% and 3% which was lower than the 2016 forecast for 2017. This would represent an increase of $348 in 2018 compared to 2017. It was the first year that the researchers reported on the "major discounting and disruption" caused by the Walmart, Costco and Amazon in the food landscape in Canada. CBC News reported that the biggest increases in the price of vegetables and restaurant food, which were forecase to increase between 4% and 6%. This was a larger increase than the usual 1% to 3% "normally experienced by restaurants".

2019
The Globe and Mail reported the predictions for 2019, with food prices expected to rise  between 1.5% to 3.5% in 2019, which would represent an increase in the cost of food of $411 for a family of four compared to 2018. The biggest increase would be in vegetablesbetween 4% and 6%.

2020
ICI Radio Canada cited the report saying that the projected increase in the price of food for 2020 represented a greater increase than the rate of inflation.

2021
Articles by CTV News and CBC were published on the day the report for 2021  was released, 8 December 2020. Factors that contributed to increases in the price of food in Canada included the "pandemic, wildfires and changing consumer habits". The predicted overall food price increase of between 3% and 5% in 2021 was the highest "ever predicted by an annual food price report". It meant that an average family in Canada would pay  $695 more for food in 2021 than in 2020.

2022 
The 12th edition of Canada's Food Price Report 2022 included research by four universities, Dalhousie University, the University of Guelph, the University of Saskatchewan and the University of British Columbia. Predictions include an increase in total food prices between 5% and 7% with the highest increases in dairy products and vegetables. This would result in a family of four seeing an increase of almost $1000 in their annual cost of food. This represents the highest increase since 2010. In 2021, there were a number of factors that contributed to an increase in the cost of food including problems with the food supply chain, including reduced capacity in maritime transport, high costs of transportation, COVID-19 pandemic ongoing disruptions and related lockdowns, wildfires and drought, and a high rate of general inflation that rose to levels of the early 2000s.

Researchers noted that the provinces that will experience higher prices in 2022 are Alberta, British Columbia, Newfoundland and Labrador, Ontario, and Saskatchewan. Challenges with the food supply chain include disruptive closures, sanitation, transportation costs and reduced capacity.  In previous publications of the Food Price Report, predictions of overall increases have been accurate in ten of the eleven years.

References

Publications established in 2010
2010 establishments in Canada
Dalhousie University
University of Guelph
Food and drink in Canada
Economic forecasting
Economy of Canada